The Calgary Mavericks are a Canadian rugby union team based in Calgary, Alberta. The team plays in the Rugby Canada National Junior Championship and draws most of its players from the Calgary Rugby Union, one of fourteen Rugby Unions that have rep teams in the RCSL.

The Mavericks play their "home" games at Calgary Rugby Park in Calgary.

During the sixth season of the Super League the Mavericks became the first team outside of B.C. to win the league Championship defeating the Toronto Xtreme (40-24).

History
In 1998, Rugby Canada and the provincial unions agreed to form the Rugby Canada Super League. Fourteen unions and sub-unions were invited to compete in the new semi-professional league. 

In 2009, Rugby Canada decided to disband the RCSL and replace it with a new U-20 league called the Rugby Canada National Junior Championship. The Mavericks were chosen as one of the remaining RCSL clubs to enter the newly formed league.

Season-by-season records

|-
|1998 || 3 || 3 || 0 || 3rd West Division || --
|-
|1999 || 2 || 4 || 0 || 5th West Division || --
|-
|2000 || 2 || 3 || 0 || 4th West Division || --
|-
|2001 || 0 || 5 || 0 || 6th West Division || --
|-
|2002 || 3 || 2 || 0 || 4th West Division || --
|-
|2003 || 5 || 1 || 0 || 1st West Division || Won MacTier Cup (Toronto Xtreme)
|-
|2004 || 4 || 2 || 0 || 3rd West Division || --
|-
|2005 || 3 || 3 || 0 || 4th West Division || --
|-
|2006 || 2 || 2 || 0 || 3rd West Division || --
|-
|2007 || 2 || 2 || 0 || 3rd West Division || --
|-
|2008 || 4 || 0 || 0 || 1st West Division || Lost MacTier Cup (Newfoundland Rock)
|-
!rowspan="3"|Totals || 30 || 27 || 0
|colspan="2"| (regular season, 1998–2008)
|-
! 1 || 1 || 0
|colspan="2"| (playoffs, 1998–2008)
|-

External links
 Official Site

Canadian rugby union teams
Mav
Mav
Rugby clubs established in 1960
1960 establishments in Alberta